Richard Anthony Williams (August 9, 1934 – February 16, 2012) was an American actor. Williams is best known for his starring performances on Broadway in The Poison Tree, What the Wine-Sellers Buy and Black Picture Show. Williams also had notable roles in 1970s blaxploitation films such as The Mack and Slaughter's Big Rip-Off.

Early life
Born in Chicago, Illinois, Williams was raised in the Bronzeville neighborhood. During his early childhood, Williams spent several years in a local hospital due to having polio. For high school, Williams attended Hyde Park Academy High School. Williams later attended Herzl Junior College (now known as City Colleges of Chicago).

Career
Williams began his career during his late teens as a member of Williams Brothers Quartet, singing group founded in Chicago. He later moved to Los Angeles and began his acting career. Some of Williams roles included Pretty Tony in The Mack (1973), the limo driver in Dog Day Afternoon (1975), Denzel Washington's father in Mo' Better Blues (1990) and Officer Allen in Edward Scissorhands (1990), and his other film credits include Uptight (1968), The Anderson Tapes (1971), Who Killed Mary What's 'Er Name? (1971), Five on the Black Hand Side (1973), Deadly Hero (1975), The Deep (1977), An Almost Perfect Affair (1979), The Jerk (1979), The Night the City Screamed (1980), The Star Chamber (1983) Gardens of Stone (1987), as Diamond's father in The Players Club (1998), and Roberto in Blood and Bone (2009).

In television, Williams guest starred in the Season 1 episode of Starsky & Hutch, "Kill Huggy Bear."  He played the title character in the Phillip Hayes Dean drama Freeman, broadcast on PBS in October 1977.  In the 1978 six-hour NBC docudrama King, about the life of Martin Luther King Jr., Williams played the role of Malcolm X.  He guest starred on a number of TV shows including The Rockford Files, Cagney & Lacey, Lou Grant and Hart to Hart. Williams was a regular cast member on the post World War II–era ABC primetime soap opera Homefront (1991-1993), appearing in all 42 episodes as chauffeur Abe Davis.  In 1996, he played the father of Larry's assistant Beverley in an episode of The Larry Sanders Show. Williams also starred in the documentary film The Meeting, about two African-American political leaders (Malcolm X and Martin Luther King Jr.) discussing the fate of black people in America. In 1971–1972, Williams appeared in Melvin Van Peebles' acclaimed off-Broadway musical "Ain't Supposed to Die a Natural Death." One of Williams' co-stars in the production was actress Gloria Edwards who would later become his wife.

Awards and nominations
Williams won the 1974 Drama Desk Award for his performance in What the Wine-Sellers Buy, for which he was also nominated for a Tony Award, and was nominated in 1975 for both a Tony and a Drama Desk Award for his performance in Black Picture Show.

Personal life
Williams was married twice and had three children. In 1974, he married actress Gloria Edwards and together they had two children; Jason Edward Williams and Mikah Lauren Williams. Williams had a daughter, Mona Williams from a previous marriage. Williams and Edwards were married until Edwards death in 1988. Williams died of cancer on February 16, 2012, at Valley Presbyterian Hospital in Van Nuys, California.

Selected filmography

Uptight (1968) – Corbin
The Lost Man (1969) – Ronald
The Anderson Tapes (1971) – Spencer
Who Killed Mary What's 'Er Name? (1971) – Malthus
The Mack (1973) – Pretty Tony
Slaughter's Big Rip-Off (1973) – Joe Creole
Five on the Black Hand Side (1973) – Preston
Dog Day Afternoon (1975) – Limo Driver
Deadly Hero (1975) – D.A. Winston
The Long Night (1976) – Paul
The Deep (1977) – Slake
An Almost Perfect Affair (1979) – Andrew Jackson
The Jerk (1979) – Taj
Hollow Image (1979)
Sister, Sister (1982) – Reverend Richard Henderson
Grizzly II: The Concert (1983) – Charlie
Through Naked Eyes (1983) – Det. Wylie
The Star Chamber (1983) – Det. Paul Mackey
Summer Rental (1985) – Dan Gardner
Gardens of Stone (1987) – Slasher Williams
Tap (1989) – Francis
Mo' Better Blues (1990) – Big Stop Williams
Edward Scissorhands (1990) – Officer Allen
The Rapture (1991) – Henry
The Gifted (1993)
The Players Club (1998) – Mr. Armstrong
Virgin Again (2004) – David
The Stolen Moments of September (2007) – Asa Jamir / Henry Washington
Steam (2007) – August
Blood and Bone (2009) – Roberto

References

External links
 
 

1934 births
2012 deaths
African-American male actors
American male film actors
Male actors from Chicago
People from Chicago
American male television actors
Hyde Park Academy High School alumni
20th-century African-American people
21st-century African-American people